Ho East is one of the constituencies represented in the Parliament of Ghana. It elects one Member of Parliament (MP) by the first past the post system of election. Ho East is located in the Adaklu-Anyigbe district of the Volta Region of Ghana.

Boundaries
The seat is located entirely within the Adaklu-Anyigbe district of the Volta Region of Ghana.

Members of Parliament

Elections

See also
List of Ghana Parliament constituencies

References 

Adam Carr's Election Archives
Ghana Home Page
Electoral Commission of Ghana

Parliamentary constituencies in the Volta Region